Martin Lyndsey DD (or Lindsey) was an English 16th-century university vice-chancellor,

Lyndsey was a Doctor of Divinity and a Fellow of Lincoln College, Oxford. In 1527, Lyndsey was appointed Vice-Chancellor of the University of Oxford.

References

Bibliography
 

Year of birth unknown
Year of death unknown
English Roman Catholics
Fellows of Lincoln College, Oxford
Vice-Chancellors of the University of Oxford
16th-century English educators